Charles H. "Rucker" Blackwell (December 12, 1894 – April 22, 1935) was an American baseball outfielder in the Negro leagues. He played from 1915 to 1929 with several teams, playing mostly with the and St. Louis Giants/Stars.

References

External links
 and Baseball-Reference Black Baseball stats and Seamheads

1894 births
1935 deaths
Birmingham Black Barons players
Indianapolis ABCs players
Detroit Stars players
St. Louis Giants players
St. Louis Stars (baseball) players
St. Louis Giants (1924) players
People from Brandenburg, Kentucky
Baseball players from Kentucky
Baseball outfielders
20th-century African-American sportspeople